The Yale University coat of arms is the primary emblem of Yale University. It has a field of the color Yale Blue with an open book and the Hebrew words Urim and Thummim inscribed upon it in Hebrew letters. Below the shield on a scroll appears Yale's official motto, Lux et Veritas (Latin for "Light and Truth").

History 
The first known seal of Yale appears on the master's diploma of its future president Ezra Stiles in 1746. In addition to the Hebrew words "Urim ve'Thummim" inscribed on two books on a shield, it had the Latin words Lux et Veritas surrounding the shield.

The Hebrew words Urim and Thummim are used due to a belief among scholars at the time that "Light and Truth" was an adequate translation for these words.  According to the Hebrew Bible, the priests used tools called the Urim and Thummim to discern the will of the Lord.

See also 

 Urim and Thummim
 Heraldry of Columbia University
 Heraldry of Harvard University

Sources 

Yale
Shields of Yale University
Yale University